Tawęcino  (German Tauentzien) is a village in the administrative district of Gmina Nowa Wieś Lęborska, within Lębork County, Pomeranian Voivodeship, in northern Poland.

The village has a population of 304.

Notable residents
 Friedrich Bogislav von Tauentzien (1710–1791), general

References

Villages in Lębork County